Taklibhan is a village located in Ahmednagar district, Maharashtra state in India. It was previously known as "Raja Bhanachi Takli" meaning Takli of king Bhan. The village is situated between Shrirampur and Nevasa.

External links 
www.everysingleplace.com

Villages in Ahmednagar district